Rafael Ruelas (born 26 April 1971) is a Mexican former professional boxer, best known for his knockout loss to Oscar De La Hoya.

Professional career
Shortly after a TKO in 10 over Jorge Páez in 1992, Ruelas earned a shot at IBF lightweight title Freddie Pendleton, overcoming an early knockdown and winning by unanimous decision.

Ruelas was able to successfully defend his title prior to being challenged by the rapidly rising star Oscar De La Hoya. De la Hoya defeated Ruelas, knocking him down twice and ending the fight in the second round.

Ruelas never recaptured his lost glory, winning fights over limited competition, including a decision over journeyman Livingstone Bramble, to set up a fight with the hard punching Kostya Tszyu in 1998. Tszyu battered Ruelas and won via TKO 9, and Ruelas's career ended shortly afterward.

Professional boxing record

Pay-per-view bouts

References

External links 
 

1971 births
Living people
Boxers from Jalisco
International Boxing Federation champions
Mexican male boxers
Featherweight boxers